was a town located in Kitasōma District, Ibaraki Prefecture, Japan.

As of 2003, the town had an estimated population of 32,829 and a density of 998.75 persons per km². The total area was 32.87 km².

On March 28, 2005, Fujishiro was merged into the expanded city of Toride and no longer exists as an independent municipality.

Sister cities
 Yuba City, California, United States of America determined by Sister Cities International.

External links
 Official website of Toride 

Dissolved municipalities of Ibaraki Prefecture